Severny Airport (English: Northern airport)  was a small airport in northern part of Novosibirsk, Russia. Opened in 1929, it was the only airport in Novosibirsk until Tolmachevo Airport opened in 1957. JSC "Novosibirsk Air Enterprise" was the main airline operating out of this airport, serving regional routes by An-2, An-24, An-26, An-30, and Let-410 aircraft. Following the second bankruptcy of Novosibirsk Air Enterprise (after which the airline ceased operations) in 2010, the airport closed in February 2011. As of 2015, part of its airfield is used as a heliport for local police helicopters and a nearby aircraft maintenance facility.

External links
  Novosibirsk Air Enterprise website

Defunct airports
Airports built in the Soviet Union
Buildings and structures in Novosibirsk
Airports in Novosibirsk Oblast
Zayeltsovsky City District, Novosibirsk
Cultural heritage monuments of regional significance in Novosibirsk Oblast